Brutha  is the eponymous debut studio album by American R&B group Brutha released on December 21, 2008 by Def Jam Recordings.

The album was supported by one single, "I Can't Hear The Music" featuring rapper Fabolous. It peaked at #81 on the Billboard 200, and has sold 100,000 copies in total. It remains the group's only full length project to be released.

Track listing

Charts

Weekly charts

Year-end charts

References 

2008 debut albums
Brutha albums
Def Jam Recordings albums
Albums produced by Jermaine Dupri
Albums produced by Jazze Pha
Albums produced by Ne-Yo